Sheikh Rahimullah Haqqani (died; 11 August 2022) was an Afghan Islamic scholar and director of Afghan Madrasas and principal at Madrasah Zubaria in Peshawar. Haqqani also led a brigade of the Afghan Taliban in Nangarhar province. He was a former student of Darul Uloom Haqqania. He was student of Shaikh Idrees.  

Haqqani had a tough stance on ISIS. He was considered very close to the Afghan Taliban. Haqqani used to work as a principal at Madrasah Zubaria in Peshawar's Deer Colony in Pakistan. After the survival of the Peshawar blast, Rahimullah Haqqani blamed the attack on Khawarij. The Afghan Taliban use the term Khawarij for extremists affiliated with ISIS.

Assassination attempts
There were two attacks on him in Peshawar in which he was safe. He also have a madrassa in Peshawar where a suicide attack took place in October 2020. Haqqani was also unsuccessfully attacked in Peshawar's Ring Road in 2013.

Death
He was killed on 11 August 2022 in a suicide attack in a seminary in Kabul, the Afghan capital. The said seminary belonged to Rahimullah Haqqani, and he was the target of this suicide attack.

References

Deobandis
2022 deaths
Afghan Islamists
Pakistani people of Afghan descent
Taliban commanders
Darul Uloom Haqqania alumni